Franco Pérez may refer to:

 Franco Pérez (footballer, born 1996), Argentine forward for Deportivo Madryn
 Franco Pérez (footballer, born 1998), Argentine forward for Aldosivi
 Franco Pérez (footballer, born 2001), Uruguayan football forward